Abel Lawrence Foster (September 17, 1802 - May 21, 1877) was a United States Representative from New York.

Biography
A. Lawrence Foster was born on September 17, 1802, in Littleton, Massachusetts.  He studied law in Vernon, New York, was admitted to the bar and commenced practice in Morrisville, New York, in 1827.

Foster ran unsuccessfully for Congress in 1838. In 1840, he was elected as a Whig to the Twenty-seventh Congress (March 4, 1841, to March 3, 1843). During his term, Foster was Chairman of the Committee on Expenditures in the Department of the Treasury. He did not run for reelection in 1842.

In 1844, he moved to a farm in Fairfax, Virginia, which included the land that is now Tysons Corner. In the 1850s, he served as a Fairfax County Commissioner.

During the Civil War Foster supported the Union, and relocated temporarily to Washington, D.C.  In 1862, he was appointed U.S. Indian Agent for the Chippewa of the Mississippi in Minnesota.

After the Civil War he returned to Fairfax, and was appointed one of three U.S. Tax Commissioners for the northern part of the state after Virginia was readmitted to the Union.  In this capacity he was responsible for the sale to the federal government of the Robert E. Lee estate, which is now Arlington National Cemetery.

Foster's health began to fail in the 1870s, after which he resided in Washington, D.C. He died there on May 21, 1877, and was buried in Glenwood Cemetery.

In the 1890s, his heirs petitioned Congress to compensate them nearly $29,000 (over $712,000 in 2009) for Foster's property and supplies that were used by the Union Army or destroyed by the Confederacy.  In the early 1900s the United States Court of Claims authorized partial payment to resolve the case.

References

External links

 A. Lawrence Foster biography at the Political Graveyard
 Foster Genealogy on Google Books

1802 births
1877 deaths
People from Littleton, Massachusetts
People from Morrisville, New York
Politicians from Fairfax, Virginia
People from Washington, D.C.
New York (state) lawyers
Members of the Fairfax County Board of Supervisors
Virginia Unionists
Burials at Glenwood Cemetery (Washington, D.C.)
Whig Party members of the United States House of Representatives from New York (state)
19th-century American politicians
19th-century American lawyers